Yerokhin is a surname. Notable people with the surname include:

Aleksandr Yerokhin (born 1989), Russian footballer
Aleksandr Yuryevich Yerokhin (born 1985), Russian footballer
Igor Yerokhin (born 1985), Russian race walker
Valentin Yerokhin (born 1945), Russian footballer
Viktor Yerokhin (1940-2014), Russian footballer
Vladimir Yerokhin (1930-1996) Russian footballer

Russian-language surnames